The PMK gas mask represents a family of gas masks used by the Soviet Armed Forces, and later by the Armed Forces of the Russian Federation.  It can be distinguished from its civilian counterpart, the GP-7, by its rounded triangular lenses, versus the GP-7's circular lenses.

Filtering 
The original PMK mounted the filter on only the left side of the mask.  However, the filter could be mounted on both sides on the PMK-2 and later models.  The filters themselves are designed to filter out toxic or radioactive vapors or aerosols, as well as biological agents.  Although the filters are similar to and have the same 40 mm GOST threads as the GP-5 gas mask, they are a slightly different design, having a sloping top with ridges stamped into the metal.

Drinking system 
The PMK gas mask contains a drinking tube, allowing soldiers wearing the mask to rehydrate without removing the mask itself.  The system consists of a special canteen cap, which will only allow water to flow through when connected to the tube leading to the mask. This system is compatible with standard type m drinking systems.

Appearance 
Early versions of the PMK have the trim around the lenses and over the voice diaphragm painted black.  Later versions have the metal components of the mask left unpainted.  The rubber parts of the mask are always black.

Civilian ownership 
Older versions of the PMK can be easily acquired through sites such as eBay.

References 

http://www.armygasmasks.com/Russian-GP-7VM-PMK-2-Gas-Mask-p/aaagas-44.htm

https://www.youtube.com/watch?v=tga13gYcp9A

Gas masks of the Soviet Union
Military equipment of Russia
Military equipment introduced in the 1980s